The Jona is a river in the Swiss cantons of Zürich and St. Gallen.

Geography 

The Jona rises on the eastern slope of Bachtel hill near Gibswil and Fischenthal in the Zürcher Oberland. Passing an impressive waterfall, the river flows near the municipality of Wald through a little valley eastward and changes its direction to the south by a ravine, which a viaduct of the Tösstalbahn (S26) is crossing. The Jona turns to the west, dividing the municipalities Dürnten and Rüti, passing the village of Tann and Rüti in the so-called Tannertobel. Once again, it changes its direction, flowing to the south (and slightly meandering) through Rüti and the so-called Joner Wald (forest of Rapperswil-Jona), followed by the S-Bahn Zürich lines S5 and S15. The river underneaths here Oberland Autobahn (A53 highway), now reaching the canton of St. Gallen and Rapperswil-Jona, flowing nearly in straight direction through the village of Jona (SG). Finally, it forms a small river delta near Busskirch and flows at Stampf lido in the Obersee, the upper section of the Zürichsee.

History and some facts 
The river's name was first mentioned in 834 AD, the former municipality Jona was named much later. It is assumed that the name originates as either Celtic Jauna (the cold one) – the Jona is still largely determined by forest area – or, as Indo-European yamam, meaning stream. Latest interpretations say that the Indo-European word jeu roughly means to move, followed by the Old High German name Jouna .

Its hydropower was used for a larger number of medieval watermills along the small river. As a renewable source, in the 19th century, the river was important for industrialization of the textile industry of the communities of Wald, Rüti, and Rapperswil-Jona.

The river belongs to the Limmat→Aar→Rhine system. Its drainage basin measures

Gallery

References

External links 

 Dorfverein Wagen 

Rivers of the canton of St. Gallen
Rapperswil-Jona
Rivers of the canton of Zürich
Tributaries of Lake Zurich
Rüti, Zürich
Rivers of Switzerland